Learning to Walk is a compilation of early Sole singles and demos recorded between 1994 and 1998, released on the Anticon sister label, 6 Months.

Track listing

References

External links

2002 compilation albums
Sole (hip hop artist) albums